The Aberdeen Brunei Senior Masters presented by Stapleford Forum was a men's professional golf tournament on the European Senior Tour. It was contested from 2009 to 2011 and was played at The Empire Hotel & Country Club, Jerudong in Brunei. The 2011 event had prize money of $350,000.

Winners

External links
Coverage on the European Senior Tour's official site

Former European Senior Tour events
Golf tournaments in Brunei
Recurring sporting events established in 2009
Recurring sporting events disestablished in 2011
Defunct sports competitions in Brunei